Disney California Adventure Park, commonly referred to as California Adventure or by its acronym DCA, is a theme park located at the Disneyland Resort in Anaheim, California. It is owned and operated by The Walt Disney Company through its Parks, Experiences and Products division. The  park is themed after Disney's interpretation of California, which is manifested through the use of various Disney, Pixar and Marvel Studios properties. The park opened on February 8, 2001, as Disney's California Adventure Park and is the second of two theme parks built at the Disneyland Resort complex, after Disneyland Park.

The concept of a theme park dedicated to California arose from a meeting of Disney executives in 1995, following the cancellation of WestCOT, a planned West Coast version of Walt Disney World's utopian EPCOT Center. Construction of the park began in June 1998 and was completed by early 2001. Disney initially projected high attendance rates at the new park; a series of preview openings held in January 2001 led to negative reviews, however, and after the park officially opened to the public on February 8, 2001, the company's attendance projections were never met. Disney spent the next several years incrementally adding new rides, shows, and attractions, and implementing other promotions aimed at boosting attendance. In 2007, Disney announced a major overhaul of the park consisting of new expansion as well as re-construction of existing areas of the park. Construction lasted for five years and was completed in stages, culminating with the opening of Buena Vista Street and Cars Land along with the re-dedication of the park in June 2012. The most recent addition to the park was the completion of Avengers Campus when the Disneyland Resort reopened in mid-2021, after being closed for over a year due to the COVID-19 pandemic.

According to the Themed Entertainment Association, the park hosted approximately 9.9 million guests in 2018, making it the 12th-most visited theme park in the world that year.

History

Concept and creation

The present-day site of Disney California Adventure was acquired by Walt Disney in the 1950s and functioned as the parking lot of Disneyland for over 40 years. After succeeding with the multi-park business model at Walt Disney World in Florida, the Disney company decided to turn Walt Disney's original theme park into a multi-park resort complex as well. Disneyland was boxed-in, however, because of the growth of Anaheim around the park; while the Walt Disney World property was 30,000 acres at the time, the Disneyland site was about 400. This consisted of the park itself, the 100-acre parking lot, and the newly acquired Disneyland Hotel and vacation property from the Wrather Corporation. In 1991, Disney announced plans to build WestCOT, a west coast version of what was then known as EPCOT Center, on the site of Disneyland's parking lot. The price tag of the proposed park was high and the company was facing financial and public relation problems with the newly opened Euro Disneyland (now Disneyland Paris). Plus, Disney president Frank Wells died in a helicopter crash in 1994. These issues led Disney to cancel WestCOT in 1995.

In the summer of 1995, Michael Eisner, Disney's CEO at the time, gathered company executives in Aspen, Colorado, to think of another idea for a second theme park in California. They broke down the Disneyland problem as follows: The majority of the people visiting Disneyland consisted primarily of California residents, locals, or those traveling from nearby states. Those who were visiting from another state or another country, probably had Disneyland as one of the several attractions to do in California. Based on this, Disney decided it would instead build a park themed to California's history and culture. Disney's executives aimed to make California a theme park, to keep guests at the resort instead of going off-site. This would require less expensive hotels, a single parking garage, and very little additional property acquisition, with most of the park residing on the Disneyland parking lot. Then-Disneyland president Paul Pressler relied on merchandising and retail staff instead of Imagineers to design the park. As an adult-oriented park-like Epcot, dining, and shopping were the design focus. Construction of the park began on January 22, 1998. On Main Street, U.S.A., a Disney's California Adventure Preview Center opened in October 1998. The park's construction was accompanied by Downtown Disney and Disney's Grand Californian Hotel, in addition to renovations of the Disneyland Hotel and Disneyland Pacific Hotel.

Opening and initial criticism

The park was expected to draw large crowds when it opened on February 8, 2001. There were four districts with 22 shows and attractions and 15 restaurants.

On January 14, a Los Angeles Times article stated, "Senior Disney officials acknowledge that there will be days when California Adventure will have to turn patrons away, particularly in the first weeks after the park opens, during spring break and again in the summer." The attendance that year was substantially less than expected, however. This is suggested to have happened as a result of negative reviews from early visitors. For example, Disney had originally planned the park to be aimed at adults, rather than children and families, which became the basis of significant criticism.

The park opened to 5 million visitors in 2001 while its sister park Disneyland saw 12.3 million visitors during the same time frame. Low attendance caused Disney to lower ticket prices for California Adventure, slashing as much as $10 off the park's ticket prices. In its first year, the park averaged 5,000 to 9,000 visitors on weekdays and 10,000 to 15,000 on the weekends, despite having a capacity of 33,000. Visitor surveys reported that 20% of visitors to the park in its first year were satisfied with their experience. By October 2001, both Wolfgang Puck and Robert Mondavi had closed their high-profile restaurants in the park, citing low crowds, though Mondavi remained as a sponsor.

In the 2019 documentary series The Imagineering Story, then-Walt Disney Imagineering creative executive Kevin Rafferty described how he and other Imagineers felt about the original design of California Adventure:

Reflecting on the park's initial reception in The Imagineering Story, Barry Braverman, executive producer of California Adventure (1995–2001) stated;

Early changes and expansions
Two major criticisms of the park in its first year were the lack of attractions appealing to children and the lack of a nighttime show or parade to keep visitors from leaving at nightfall. Within the first year of operation, Disney's Electrical Parade and Who Wants to Be a Millionaire – Play It! were brought to the park, and several of its original rides and attractions were closed, including Superstar Limo and the stage show Disney's Steps in Time. During the 2001 holiday season, Disney's LuminAria was presented on Paradise Bay. In October 2002, the Flik's Fun Fair area opened, which added attractions for children, and in May 2004, The Twilight Zone Tower of Terror opened as another E ticket. The park regularly featured seasonal promotions such as concert series, food festivals, and promotions for other Walt Disney Company franchises including the X Games and ABC soap operas. Monsters, Inc. Mike & Sulley to the Rescue! opened in the former Superstar Limo building in January 2006.

Major redesign and expansion

By 2007, Disney began making plans for major updates to the park. CEO Bob Iger said, "Any time you do something mediocre with your brand, that's withdrawal. California Adventure was a brand withdrawal." Iger briefly considered combining California Adventure and Disneyland Park into one large park, but the price would have cost as much as completely remodeling California Adventure. On October 17, 2007, The Walt Disney Company announced a multi-year, $1.1 billion redesign and expansion plan for Disney's California Adventure Park (against its initial $600 million cost to build). Each district was reimagined to transform the park from a spoof of modern California culture to a romanticized, idealized version of the state, exploring specific time periods and historic settings. The project began in December 2007 and was completed in stages. Toy Story Midway Mania! opened on Paradise Pier in June 2008, in space formerly occupied by a store and restaurants. World of Color, nighttime water and lights show on Paradise Bay, opened in June 2010. The Little Mermaid: Ariel's Undersea Adventure opened on the site formerly occupied by the Golden Dreams theater in June 2011.

The most drastic changes to the park included a complete overhaul of the main entrance, Sunshine Plaza, and Paradise Pier and an expansion into the last of the parking area originally designated as future growth space for the park. The main entrance and Sunshine Plaza were turned from a "giant postcard" spoof of California into Buena Vista Street, a representation of Los Angeles as it appeared when Walt Disney moved there in the 1920s.  The "CALIFORNIA" sign in front was removed and donated to Cal Expo in Sacramento. Paradise Pier was turned from a contemporary representation of California boardwalks into a representation of Victorian seaside amusement parks of the 1920s, and some of the area's off-the-shelf rides were either removed outright (Maliboomer) or re-themed to have more of a focus on Disney characters (Mickey's Fun Wheel, Goofy's Sky School, Silly Symphony Swings). Cars Land, an area that simulates Radiator Springs from Disney·Pixar's Cars film franchise, was added to the southeast portion of the park and features three rides, including the E ticket Radiator Springs Racers. Construction was completed in 2012 and the park was then re-dedicated on June 15, 2012. The park received a modified name, Disney California Adventure, and a new logo first put into use in June 2010.

The redesign and expansion of the park saw attendance rates increase dramatically. In 2012, Disney California Adventure reached a record high for the park of over 7 million visitors (a 23% increase from the year before), a number Disney had hoped the park would attain in its first year. The day of the park's rededication saw the park draw a record number of 43,000 visitors in one day. The night before the rededication, over 500 people camped outside of the park in order to be the first admitted in. Two days later, the park hit a new record of 45,000 visitors. Speaking on the attendance increase at Disney California Adventure, Jay Rasulo, Disney's chief financial officer, said: "We had a very uneven distribution where most people spent most of their time at Disneyland and Disney's California Adventure was empty. Now, half of the folks go to one, half of the folks go to the other. It's almost a dream come true."

COVID-19 pandemic closures, partial and full reopening

Disney California Adventure, along with Disneyland, was closed indefinitely starting on March 14, 2020, in response to the COVID-19 pandemic. The park was scheduled to reopen alongside Disneyland on July 17, but due to rising cases in California, both parks remained closed. In October 2020, it was announced that Buena Vista Street would open as an expansion of the Downtown Disney District. This expansion would allow for additional shops and dining options for visitors to the Disneyland Resort, while the parks remained closed under State guidelines. In February 2021, Disney California Adventure announced there would be a limited-capacity ticketed event called “A Touch of Disney”, which would allow Disney fans to shop at stores and enjoy eateries around the park from March 18 through April 19, 2021. On March 5, 2021, it was announced by the California Department of Public Health that Disney California Adventure was allowed to reopen with capacity restrictions beginning April 1, 2021. Disney CEO Bob Chapek then announced the following week that the company planned on officially reopening the park in late April 2021. On March 17, 2021, Disney Parks, Experiences and Products announced that both Disney California Adventure and Disneyland would officially reopen on April 30, 2021, with limited capacity and social distancing and mask guidelines in effect. Mask policies were relaxed at the Disneyland Resort in the summer of 2021, but ultimately were reinstated for indoor shops and attractions in July in response to the Delta variant. In February 2022, face masks were made optional for guests who are fully vaccinated.

Park layout and attractions 

Disney California Adventure is divided into eight themed lands; Buena Vista Street, Pixar Pier, Paradise Gardens, Pacific Wharf, Grizzly Peak, Hollywood Land, Avengers Campus, and Cars Land.

Buena Vista Street 

Buena Vista Street is the first area seen upon entering the park. It represents Los Angeles in the 1920s, when Walt Disney first arrived there. Similar to Main Street, U.S.A. in Disneyland Park, it has shops, restaurants, and a transportation system. Its central hub has entrances to Hollywood Land, Grizzly Peak, and Pacific Wharf. In the hub's center, also known as Carthay Circle, is a replica of the Carthay Circle Theater, where Disney's Snow White and the Seven Dwarves debuted in 1937. Guests can ride from Buena Vista Street to the end of Hollywood Land on the Red Car Trolley. It stops at Kingswell Camera Shop, and the Carthay Circle Restaurant. Other restaurants along the street include Mortimer's Market; Trolley Treats; Clarabelle's Hand Scooped Ice Cream; and Fiddler, Fifer & Practical Cafe. Main stores along the street include Oswald's, Five & Dime, Big Top Toys, Kingswell Camera Shop, and Elias & Co.

Hollywood Land 

Hollywood Land is inspired by the Golden Age of Hollywood in the 1930s. It includes attractions based on film, television, theater and a subsection called Hollywood Studios, which is designed to appear as an active studio backlot. Found within that subsection is the 3D film Mickey's PhilharMagic and the Monsters, Inc. Mike & Sulley to the Rescue! attraction, a dark ride based on the characters from Disney·Pixar's Monsters, Inc. The land is also home to the 2000-seat Hyperion Theater, which formerly presented Frozen – Live at the Hyperion. Between Monster's Inc. and Mickey's Philharmagic is Stage 17: Backlot Premiere Shop, a large store dedicated to carrying all Marvel merchandise.

Disney Junior – Live on Stage! opened on March 25, 2011, in the Disney Theater, and has featured stage productions such as Mickey Mouse Clubhouse, Sofia the First, Doc McStuffins, and Jake and the Never Land Pirates. Its final day of performance was April 9, 2017. It was replaced by Disney Junior Dance Party, which opened on May 26, 2017, and most recently featured Mickey and the Roadster Racers, Doc McStuffins, Vampirina, and The Lion Guard. Next door to Disney Theater is the Animation Building, which hosts Sorcerer's Workshop (a walk-through exhibit focused on basic animation and determining which Disney character matches your personality), Animation Academy (a workshop that teaches Guests how to draw popular Disney characters), Turtle Talk with Crush, and an Elsa & Anna Meet and Greet. Outside of the Animation Building and Disney Theater are the land's two main stores: Off the Page and Gone Hollywood.

The restroom facilities in the district are designed in the style of Frank Lloyd Wright's Storer House, located in the Hollywood Hills area of Los Angeles. The stamped concrete structure is typical of Wright's pioneering design.

Grizzly Peak 

Grizzly Peak is themed around California's wilderness and national parks, with particular references to Yosemite and Redwood national parks. Its main attraction is Grizzly River Run, a Gold Rush-esque river rapids ride around the area's summit. Nearby is the Redwood Creek Challenge Trail, a playground area with elements from Disney's Brother Bear (2003) and Disney·Pixar's Up (2009). It has an entrance exclusively accessible to guests of Disney's Grand Californian Hotel & Spa.

Grizzly Peak Airfield, formally known as Condor Flats, is a sub-land within Grizzly Peak, themed to an airfield in California's High Sierras in the late 1950s and early 1960s. The area's main attraction is Soarin' Around the World, which simulates a hang-glider tour of locations, landscapes and landmarks across six of the world's continents. The area also has the Smokejumpers Grill counter-service restaurant, a shop, and a decorative fire lookout tower.

Paradise Gardens 
Paradise Gardens, the largest land in Disney California Adventure, is at the park's center, with direct entrances to Pixar Pier, Pacific Wharf and Grizzly Peak. The Paradise Gardens Park area, in front of The Little Mermaid, is a prominent place to watch the World of Color water show and for taking photos with Pixar Pier as a backdrop. Paradise Garden's five attractions include Goofy's Sky School, Silly Symphony Swings, Jumpin' Jellyfish, Golden Zephyr, and The Little Mermaid ~ Ariel's Undersea Adventure. The Paradise Gardens neighborhood also hosts many of the Resort's seasonal and cultural celebrations throughout the year. Some of these celebrations include the Dia de los Muertos celebration during the fall (with two shows, A Musical Celebration of Coco and Mariachi Divas), the Festival of the Holidays (with "Disney Viva Navidad Street Party" and "Mickey's Happy Holidays"), and the Lunar New Year Festival (with "Mulan's Lunar New Year Processional"). Most parades and cavalcades that run through the park begin in Paradise Gardens and travel north towards Buena Vista Street.

Pacific Wharf 
Located between Pixar Pier and Cars Land, Pacific Wharf is themed to resemble the old waterfront of Monterey, California as a tribute to its fishing industry. Its attractions are The Bakery Tour and the Walt Disney Imagineering Blue Sky Cellar. This area is primarily an outdoor food court with the following restaurants:
Cocina Cucamonga Mexican Grill
Lucky Fortune Cookery Chinese Wok
Mendocino Terrace
Ghirardelli Soda Fountain and Chocolate Shop
Magic Key Terrace
Pacific Wharf Café (Boudin Bakery)
Pacific Wharf Distribution Co.
Rita's Baja Blenders
Sonoma Terrace
Wine Country Trattoria

In September 2022, it was announced that Pacific Wharf will be re-themed to San Fransokyo, a combination of San Francisco and Tokyo, as seen in Disney's 2014 film Big Hero 6. In February 2023, it was announced that the name of the re-themed area will be San Fransokyo Square, and that it will open in summer 2023.

Cars Land 

Cars Land is a land designed to look like the town of Radiator Springs from the Disney·Pixar's 2006 film Cars on the town's big race day. The land spans  and contains three attractions. The largest attraction, Radiator Springs Racers, is a dark ride that utilizes the technology of Epcot's Test Track. Based on Pixar's  Cars films, the ride begins with a scenic drive through the mountains, then enters a show building, where the vehicle finds its way into the town of Radiator Springs and gets a race briefing from Doc Hudson; the ride ends with an outdoor, side-by-side dueling race to the Comfy Caverns Motor Court. With a budget of an estimated US$200 million, it is the most expensive theme park ride ever built.

The other attractions at Cars Land are family attractions with smaller height requirements: Mater's Junkyard Jamboree and Luigi's Rollickin' Roadsters. Mater's Junkyard Jamboree opened with Cars Land in 2012. Luigi's Rollickin' Roadsters opened on March 7, 2016, and replaced Luigi's Flying Tires.

The land includes several dining and shopping venues. The district serves as a connection between Pacific Wharf, Hollywood Land, and Avengers Campus. Construction began in July 2009 and opened to the public on June 15, 2012.

In September 2017, Cars Land received Halloween decorations during Halloween Time at the Disneyland Resort. Two Cars Land attractions, Luigi's Rollickin' Roadsters and Mater's Junkyard Jamboree, became Luigi's Honkin' Haul-O-Ween and Mater's Graveyard JamBOOree. Cars Land also receives holiday overlays, where Luigi's Rollickin' Roadsters becomes Luigi's Joy to the Whirl, and Mater's Junkyard Jamboree becomes Mater's Jingle Jamboree.

Pixar Pier 

Pixar Pier is themed after films produced by Pixar Animation Studios, and is divided into four districts; Incredibles Park, Toy Story Boardwalk, Pixar Promenade, and Inside Out Headquarters. Its attractions include the Pixar Pal-A-Round, Incredicoaster, Jessie's Critter Carousel, Games of Pixar Pier, Toy Story Midway Mania, and the Inside Out Emotional Whirlwind. Its main stores are Knick's Knacks, Midway Mercantile, and Bing Bong's Sweet Stuff, and offers table-service dining at the Lamplight Lounge. It is connected to Paradise Gardens Park at both ends; its main entrance is via a bridge under a large Pixar Pier gateway.

Avengers Campus 

Avengers Campus is inspired by the Marvel Cinematic Universe (MCU), featuring attractions based on characters originating from Marvel Comics and appearing in MCU media. The area is anchored around an Avengers campus located on the former restricted grounds of a Stark Industries and Strategic Scientific Reserve complex. Attractions and restaurants include Guardians of the Galaxy – Mission: Breakout!, Web Slingers: A Spider-Man Adventure,  the Ancient Sanctum, and the Pym Test Kitchen. The area opened on June 4, 2021, on the former site of A Bug's Land, after its July 2020 opening was delayed due to the COVID-19 pandemic.

Characters
As with other Disney Parks, characters based on Disney properties roam around the themed areas of the park.

Following the COVID-19 reopening, up-close character meet and greets have returned to pre-pandemic state. Nonetheless, character cavalcades  began in Paradise Gardens, as Pixar characters from Disney·Pixar's The Incredibles (2004) and Toy Story franchise roam through the land. Characters also began to meet and greet with Guests from a distance; including Goofy and Max from a balcony on Pacific Wharf, Judy Hopps and Nick Wilde from Disney's Zootopia outside of The Little Mermaid ~ Ariel's Undersea Adventure, Anna and Elsa from Disney's Frozen on Buena Vista Street, and the Avengers from the Marvel Cinematic Universe in Avengers Campus.

Former areas

Sunshine Plaza

Sunshine Plaza was the first land guests would explore when entering Disney California Adventure. It featured 2 stores, Engine Ears Toys and Greetings from California. At the center of the plaza was the “Sun Icon”.

The land closed in 2010 and was replaced by Buena Vista Street in 2012.

Bountiful Valley Farm

Bountiful Valley Farm was a themed area presented by Caterpillar. It featured farm equipment, different crops, and fake animals. When A Bug’s Land opened in 2002, the district was absorbed into the land. Caterpillar ended their sponsorship in 2007 and the area closed in 2010. It was replaced by Cars Land. A tribute to Bountiful Valley Farm can be found in Pym Test Kitchen in Avengers Campus on the labels of the enlarged ketchup and mustard bottles over the condiment station.

Paradise Pier

Paradise Pier opened in 2001 with the park. It featured attractions such as California Screamin’, The Maliboomer, The Sun Wheel and King Triton’s Carousel. The land closed in 2018 and reopened as Pixar Pier.

A Bug's Land

A Bug's Land (stylized "a bug's land") was seen from the point of view of Flik, the inventor ant from the Disney·Pixar film A Bug's Life, where oversized human items were scattered throughout. It featured Flik's Fun Fair (a collection of themed, family and child-friendly attractions such as Flik's Flyers, Francis' Ladybug Boogie, Tuck & Roll's Drive 'em Buggies, Heimlich's Chew Chew Train, and Dot's Puddle Park). It opened as the park's first expansion in 2002 to expand the park's family-friendly attractions. The land was built around the existing attraction It's Tough to Be a Bug!, a 3D film based on A Bug's Life, which opened with the park in 2001.

It's Tough to Be a Bug! closed on March 19, 2018. The rest of A Bug's Land closed on September 4, 2018, to make way for Avengers Campus. When A Bug's Land closed in 2018, Flik's Flyers was re-themed into Inside Out Emotional Whirlwind and relocated to Pixar Pier.

Alcohol policy
Unlike Disneyland Park (with the exception of Club 33 in New Orleans Square and Oga's Cantina in Star Wars: Galaxy's Edge), Disney California Adventure serves beer, wine, and cocktails throughout its restaurants, stands, and food kiosks. The park also hosts the Disney California Adventure Food & Wine Festival, an annual event featuring a number of themed kiosks, each featuring food and beverages from a particular aspect of California cuisine.

Live entertainment

Live performances
 Formerly, at the Hyperion Theater, guests were able to see Frozen – Live at the Hyperion, an hour-long musical version of the film of the same name. The show used projections and special effects to create the fictional kingdom of Arendelle with Anna, Elsa, Olaf and Kristoff. Frozen – Live at the Hyperion at the Hyperion Theater opened to the public on May 27, 2016, and was cancelled following the Park's reopening in April 2021.
 Five and Dime is a traveling street show featuring the musical talents of Dime and her five bandmates. They can be seen driving through Hollywood Land in their 1920s-style car. Following the reopening of Disney California Adventure, the performance has now shifted to a stage in front of the Carthay Circle fountain
 Red Car Newsboys is Disney California Adventure's lively street show featuring singing, dancing newsboys, and a surprise character visit.
 World of Color is nighttime water and light spectacular that transforms Paradise Bay into a water canvas. The 22-minute water show features scenes from popular Disney and Pixar films and can be used with the Made with Magic ears and accessories. During the holiday season, a holiday version of the show is offered.
 Paint the Night Parade came to Disney California Adventure after being in Disneyland.

Character experiences
 Anna and Elsa's Royal Welcome is one of the more popular character meet-and-greets in the park. The two sisters of Frozen, plus Olaf, and occasionally Kristoff, meet guests daily at Disney Animation.
 Marvel Cinematic Universe (MCU) characters Captain America, Spider-Man, Captain Marvel, and Black Panther currently meet guests daily in Avengers Campus.  Additionally, Thor, Loki, Black Widow, Hawkeye, and Doctor Strange occasionally meet guests in Avengers Campus, either at designated meet locations or as roaming encounters. Groot (Marvel Cinematic Universe) also meets guests daily in front of the Guardians of the Galaxy – Mission: Breakout! attraction and sometimes joins Star-Lord and Gamora during the Guardians of the Galaxy - Awesome Dance-Off! daily street show performances. Characters introduced in recent MCU installments appear in Avengers Campus for a limited time, and will get rotated on and off with others.
 Lightning McQueen, Mater, Red and Cruz Ramierez make appearances outside of The Cozy Cone in Cars Land. This is one of the park's most popular character meet-and-greets.
 Buzz Lightyear, Woody, Sulley, Mr. Incredible, Elastigirl, and other Pixar characters meet guests at various locations within Pixar Pier.
The Pixar Pals cavalcade began following the reopening of the Park in summer 2021. Throughout the day, a green army man drives a jeep full of Andy's toys, and is followed by characters from various Pixar films, including Woody, Jessie, Bo Peep, Mr. Incredible, Elastigirl, and Frozone.

Annual events
 The Lunar New Year Celebration (originally begun as the Happy Lunar New Year Celebration at Disneyland) is a festival first held at Disney California Adventure in 2013.  The festival celebrates the Chinese, Vietnamese and Korean cultures and includes Asian-inspired foods and a processional, taking place in January and February.  The event was canceled for 2021 due to the closure of the park as a result of the COVID-19 pandemic and resumed in 2022.  The 2023 festival will take place from January 20, 2023, to February 15, 2023, and will feature “Hurry Home – Lunar New Year Celebration”, a water show preceding the World of Color, calligraphy demonstrations, the Lucky Wishes Wall and Disney character appearances, including Mulan from  Mulan and Raya of Raya and the Last Dragon.  
 The Disney California Adventure Food & Wine Festival, inaugurated in 2006, suspended in 2011 and revived in 2016 after a five-year hiatus, is an annual festival celebrating the cuisine, wine, and beer of California, taking place during spring.  It ended abruptly after two weeks in 2020 and was canceled for 2021, both as a consequence of the COVID-19 pandemic before returning in 2022 with the re-opening of the park.  The 2023 edition of the festival is scheduled to run from March 3, 2023, to April 24, 2023, and will again feature live entertainment, culinary demonstrations, winemaker receptions and tasting seminars. 
 Oogie Boogie Bash is a separately ticketed after hours event begun in 2019 taking place on selected nights in September and October. The park closes several hours early and attendees are treated to special Halloween-themed activities, such as a music and light projection show entitled "Villainous!", an overlay of the Redwood Challenge Creek Trail area called Villains Grove, the DescenDANCE party and Mickey's Trick & Treat Show, the Frightfully Fun Parade, character meet and greets and Disney villain-themed trick or treat candy stations.  Event-exclusive food items are available for purchase.  Oogie Boogie Bash was canceled for the 2020 Halloween season as a result of the closure of the park due to the COVID-19 pandemic.  It was held again in fall 2021, featuring three new villain treat trails (including Sid from Disney·Pixar's Toy Story, Cruella from Walt Disney Studios's Cruella (2021), and Agatha Harkness from Marvel Studios's WandaVision).  The 2022 Bash began on September 6, 2022, and ran until October 31, 2022, and did not feature the Villainous! show.  New treat trail villains include Ernesto de la Cruz from Coco, Mad Madam Mim from The Sword in the Stone, and Mother Gothel from Tangled.
 Disney Festival of Holidays is a festival inspired by cultural traditions, started in 2016 and taking place in winter.  The festival celebrates traditions from holidays including Christmas, Navidad, Hanukkah, Diwali, Kwanzaa and Three Kings Day. The main attraction is the Festive Foods Marketplace, offering multicultural and diverse cuisine at participating kiosks. The event returned for its second year during the 2017 holiday season, and added new entertainment and dining options.  The event did not take place for the 2020 winter season due to the closure of the park as a result of the COVID-19 pandemic but returned for the 2021-2022 winter season.  The 2022-23 winter season festival is scheduled to run from November 11, 2022, to January 8, 2023, with live entertainment such as Mickey's Happy Holidays dance party and Holiday Toy Drummers, several musical and dance acts, a Santa meet and greet at the Redwood Creek Challenge Trail and holiday-themed overlays for the Luigi's Rollickin' Roadsters and Mater's Junkyard Jamboree attractions in Cars Land.

Attendance

Notes
 Due to the COVID-19 pandemic, the park was only open in 2020 from the beginning of the year through March 14
 Due to the worldwide impacts on park attendance due to the COVID-19 pandemic, the 2020 ranking is only among the parks that were in the top 25 for attendance in 2019

See also

 List of Disney theme park attractions
 List of Disney attractions that were never built

Similar Disney parks
 Tokyo DisneySea
 Epcot

California Adventure rides
 List of Disney California Adventure attractions
 List of former Disney California Adventure attractions
 Rail transport in Walt Disney Parks and Resorts
 List of amusement parks

References

External links

 
 

 
2001 establishments in California
Amusement parks in California
California culture
Amusement parks opened in 2001